Souris School is a Canadian public school located on the edge of Souris, Manitoba. The school teaches all grades and serves Souris, Elgin, Alexander (partially), and surrounding areas.

Alexander students have an option of attending Brandon or the school located in Alexander.

History and characteristics 
In 2013, the school reclassified Grade 5 from Elementary to Middle School
In 2014, the school was scheduled to have renovations on the aging outside walls, this was scheduled for the Summer break of 2015
In September 2015, Grades 5-8 were moved into portable classrooms due to incomplete renovations and an unstable roof. A Grade 6 class had its classes in a nearby church. Students were let back in their classrooms by late October to early-November.

Buses
The school has 9 bus routes; 3 stops in town, all across Plum Creek or The River, or on Souris's far west side. The remaining bus routes serve surrounding rural areas and smaller towns.

Extracurricular activities

Sports
Boys and Girls Basketball
Boys and Girls Badminton
Boys and Girls Rugby
Boys and Girls Track and Field
Boys and Girls Volleyball
Boys and Girls Soccer
Boys and Girls Curling

Clubs
Student Council
Chess Club
Drama Club

Student Council
Students can run for student council once they reach Grade 8. Elections are held at the end of the year, meaning that elected Grade 8's will serve on the student council when they are Grade 9's. Student council is restricted to Grade 9-12 students.

The council consists of room representatives from each grade (two representatives each from Grades 9-11; three representatives from Grade 12), a secretary, treasurer, media representative, two vice presidents, and one president. Grade 9 students cannot run for high ranks and the position of president is restricted to Grade 12.

Elementary schools in Manitoba